María José la Valenciana (1974 – 2 August 2018) was a Spanish internet personality, mostly known from her account on Instagram.

Life
Born in Sagunto, Province of Valencia, Spain and assigned male at birth, she was abandoned by her mother shortly after she was born and was raised with her grandparents. After their deaths, she was forced to practice prostitution to survive and face the expenses of the sex change operation, working mostly in "Parthenon", a night club in Torremolinos, Málaga. She was a roommate of the vedette and prostitute La Veneno. Her father, a fisherman in the port of Sagunto, tolerated her transsexuality, something unusual at that time. She began to be known in 2016 when her co-worker opened an account on Instagram, where he posted videos of her most humorous moments, reaching more than 20,000 people and Spanish public figures as followers.

Death
María José la Valenciana died on 2 August 2018 after relapsing into alcoholism shortly after finishing the detoxification process.

References

1969 births
2018 deaths
Spanish prostitutes
Transgender women
Spanish LGBT entertainers
People from Sagunto